Ruddell is a village in the Canadian province of Saskatchewan within the Rural Municipality of Mayfield No. 406 and Census Division No. 16. Ruddell post office first opened in 1906.

History 
Ruddell incorporated as a village on March 18, 1914.

Demographics 

See also

List of communities in Saskatchewan
List of villages in Saskatchewan

References

Villages in Saskatchewan
Mayfield No. 406, Saskatchewan
Division No. 16, Saskatchewan